Elizabeth Woodward is an American film producer and founder of Willa Productions. She has worked on The Great Hack (2019), The Vow (2020) and You Resemble Me (2021).

Life and career 

Woodward graduated magna cum laude and Phi Beta Kappa from Brown University. She also received a masters from the University of Cambridge. During this time, Woodward was the managing director of the Ivy Film Festival. This led to an interest in film, which led Woodward to produce and direct short films, feature films, television shows and impact campaigns.

Woodward co-produced The Great Hack about the Facebook-Cambridge Analytica data scandal. and Persuasion Machines, a virtual reality experience which explored how household devices collect personal data on their users. Persuasion Machines was narrated by will.i.am. Both The Great Hack and Persuasion Machines premiered at the Sundance Film Festival.

Woodward founded Willa Productions, a film production company, to support bold stories by innovative filmmakers. Through Willa Productions, Woodward produced You Resemble Me, a film that explores radicalization in Europe, which premiered at the 78th Venice International Film Festival in the Venice Days section. She also produced On The Divide, a film that documents the lives of three latinx people in south Texas who find themselves in the gray area of the abortion debate, which at the Tribeca Film Festival. Woodward is also producing Another Body, a documentary that will explore the world of deepfake image based abuse which was selected for the Hot Docs 2021 Selected Projects  and received the IDA Enterprise Documentary Fund Award.

Woodward speaks English, French and Italian.

Filmography

Film

Television

Awards, nominations and recognition 

Woodward was included in the Forbes 30 Under 30 Media list in 2021 for her work, and in the  Doc NYC 40 Under 40 list 2021. She was selected for Berlinale Talents and the Impact Partners Producers Fellowship

Her projects have been selected for various film festivals, shortlisted for Academy Awards, nominated for a Primetime Emmy Award, a BAFTA Award, an IDA award and won a Cinema Eye Award. Her films have been supported by Sundance Institute, Tribeca Institute, Chicken and Egg, Film Independent, Impact Partners, Field of Vision, Level Forward, Perspective Fund, and the New York Foundation for the Arts.

External links
 
 Elizabeth Woodward at Tribeca Film Institute

References 

Living people
American documentary film producers
Brown University alumni
Year of birth missing (living people)
American women documentary filmmakers
21st-century American women
American documentary film directors